Bharatganj is a Nagar Panchayat city in district of Allahabad, Uttar Pradesh.

Demographics
The Bharatganj Nagar Panchayat has population of 16,345 of which 8,467 are males while 7,878 are females as per report released by Census India 2011. Population of children with age of 0-6 is 2572 which is 15.74% of total population of Bharatganj (NP). In Bharatganj Nagar Panchayat, Female Sex Ratio is of 930 against state average of 912. Moreover, Child Sex Ratio in Bharatganj is around 1000 compared to Uttar Pradesh state average of 902. Literacy rate of Bharatganj city is 65.48% lower than state average of 67.68%. In Bharatganj, Male literacy is around 75.42% while female literacy rate is 54.64%.

Bharatganj (NP) has following religion data according to 2011 census: Muslim (Sunni)- 62.45%, Hindu- 36.92%, Other- 0.63%. Schedule Caste (SC) constitutes 12.27% of total population in Bharatganj. The Bharatganj currently does not have any Schedule Tribe (ST) population.

Bharatganj Nagar Panchayat has total administration over 2,390 houses to which it supplies basic amenities like water and sewerage. It is also authorize to build roads within Nagar Panchayat limits and impose taxes on properties coming under its jurisdiction.

Administration
The Bharatganj city is divided into 13 wards for which elections are held every 5 years.

References

Cities and towns in Allahabad district